Uroš Đerić (born 28 May 1992) is a Serbian professional footballer who plays as a striker.

Club career
Born in Trebinje, Đerić made his senior debut with Radnički Nova Pazova during the 2008–09 Serbian League Vojvodina. He was transferred to French side Amiens in the 2011 winter transfer window. Afterwards, Đerić shortly played in Croatia (Inter Zaprešić) and Finland (VPS), before returning to Serbia.

In August 2013, Đerić signed with Serbian SuperLiga club Radnički Niš. He left them after just six months and joined Serbian First League side Borac Čačak, helping them win promotion to the top flight. During his time at the club, Đerić scored just three times in official matches, once each season. He subsequently moved to fellow SuperLiga side Mladost Lučani in the 2016 winter transfer window.

In July 2016, Đerić was acquired by Sloboda Užice. He became the Serbian First League top scorer with 19 goals in the 2016–17 season. In June 2017, Đerić earned a transfer to Serbian SuperLiga club Napredak Kruševac. He scored eight goals in 18 appearances during the first half of the 2017–18 Serbian SuperLiga.

In January 2018, Đerić officially moved to South Korea and joined K League 1 club Gangwon. He was the league's second-highest scorer in the 2018 season with 24 goals, two less than Brazilian striker Marcão. In July 2019, Đerić joined K League 1 rivals Gyeongnam. He scored in the second minute of his debut in an eventual 2–2 draw with Jeju United.

Statistics

References

External links
 
 
 
  

1992 births
Living people
People from Trebinje
Serbs of Bosnia and Herzegovina
Association football forwards
Serbian footballers
FK Radnički Nova Pazova players
Amiens SC players
NK Inter Zaprešić players
Vaasan Palloseura players
FK Radnički Niš players
FK Borac Čačak players
FK Mladost Lučani players
FK Sloboda Užice players
FK Napredak Kruševac players
Gangwon FC players
Gyeongnam FC players
Serbian League players
Championnat National players
Croatian Football League players
Serbian First League players
Serbian SuperLiga players
K League 1 players
Serbian expatriate footballers
Expatriate footballers in France
Serbian expatriate sportspeople in France
Expatriate footballers in Croatia
Serbian expatriate sportspeople in Croatia
Expatriate footballers in Finland
Serbian expatriate sportspeople in Finland
Expatriate footballers in South Korea
Serbian expatriate sportspeople in South Korea